Seyyedabad (also Romanized as Seyyedābād) is a village in Salehan Rural District, in the Central District of Khomeyn County, Markazi Province, Iran. At the 2006 census, its population was 123, in 36 families.

References 

Populated places in Khomeyn County